Al-Qaiqan Mosque is one of the oldest surviving mosques in Aleppo, Syria. It is located in the western part of the Ancient City of Aleppo, within the historic walls of the city, to the north of the Gate of Antioch.

History
During the ancient times, the building had served as a Hittite pagan temple. It was turned into a mosque during the 12th century. Old carved stones with Hittite inscription were used in the construction of the mosque. Two old basalt columns could be seen at the main entrance of the building. On the southern wall of the mosque, a stone block with Anatolian hieroglyphs inscription could be found. Both Telipinu and Talmi-Šarruma, descendants of Šuppiluliuma I, are mentioned in the inscription on the south wall of the building.

The mosque was enlarged in 1965 and entirely renovated in 1996.

References

Mosques in Aleppo
12th-century mosques
Religious buildings and structures converted into mosques